Table Mountain is a large flat-topped mountain overlooking Cape Town, South Africa.

Table Mountain may also refer to:

 Table mountain or table, a butte, flank of a mountain, or mountain, that has a flat top

Mountains
 The Table (British Columbia) or Table Mountain, British Columbia, Canada
 Table Mountain, a peak in the Long Range Mountains of Newfoundland, Canada
 Table Mountains, Czech Republic and Poland
 Table Mountain (West Papua), Indonesia
 Table Mountain (Wicklow), Ireland
 Crug Hywel or Table Mountain, Wales, United Kingdom

United States
 Table Top Mountain (Juneau, Alaska)
Table Mountain (Butte County, California)
 Table Mountain (Kings County, California)
 Table Mountain (Riverside County, California), near Anza Valley
 Table Mountain (Tulare County, California)
 Table Mountain (Tuolumne County, California)
 North Table Mountain, Jefferson County, Colorado
 South Table Mountain (Colorado), Jefferson County, Colorado
 Table Mountain (Madison County, Montana)
 Table Mountain (Churchill County, Nevada)
 Table Mountain (Nye County, Nevada)
 Table Mountain (New York), in the Catskills
 Table Rock (North Carolina), or Table Rock Mountain
 Table Mountain (Skamania County, Washington)
 Table Mountain (Whatcom County, Washington)
 Table Mountain (Wyoming)

Other uses
 Table Mountain National Park in Cape Town, South Africa
 Table Mountain Observatory, San Bernardino County, California, U.S.
 Table Mountain Rancheria, Native American tribe, Fresno County, California, U.S.
 Table Mountain Wilderness, in the Monitor Range, Nevada, U.S.
 84882 Table Mountain, an asteroid
 Mensa (constellation), or Table Mountain
An early name for Mount Wellington, Tasmania, Australia
Table Mountain, the castle setting for the first four series of BBC Schools programme Megamaths